Columbia City Historic District may refer to:

Columbia City Historic District (Columbia City, Indiana), listed on the National Register of Historic Places in Whitley County, Indiana
Columbia City Historic District (Seattle, Washington), listed on the National Register of Historic Places in King County, Washington